Kozani, administratively, functions as a municipality, from 1879. Up to then, it was recognized as community. The current Mayor is Lazaros Maloutas, since 2009.

The mayors of Kozani (1879–1912) – during the Ottoman domination  

Nikolaos Chalkias (twice), Emmanouil M. Manos, Kotias Dardoufas, Nik. Rompapas (twice), Ioannis K. Govedaros (twice), Georgios Tsiminakis, Ioannis G. Govedaros, Georgios Handgiandreou (twice), Konstantinos A. Gagalis (twice), Stefanos G. Gortsoulis, Georgios Em. Manos, Nikolaos G. Armenoulis.

The mayors of Kozani since 1912

References
sourdos.gr
kozanh.gr

Kozani
Kozani